A Different Stage is a one-man show with music and lyrics by Gary Barlow and a book by Tim Firth. The show received its world premiere, close to Barlow's home town of Frodsham, in Runcorn at The Brindley in February 2022 before embarking on a tour around the UK.

The show tells the story of Barlow's life in his own words reflecting on his career, friendships and personal life.

Barlow worked on his first theatrical project in 2013 where he signed up to work on a new musical version of Finding Neverland which ran on Broadway for 17 months in 2015. Barlow then went on to co-write The Girls (later retitled in 2017 as Calendar Girls The Musical) which opened in London's West End in January 2017 before producing a UK & Ireland tour of the second Take That musical The Band in 2017 which visited London and Germany.

Productions

UK & Ireland Tour (2022) 
On 20th January 2022, it was announced the show would premiere at The Brindley, Runcorn before embarking on a UK Tour. Further dates in Salford, Liverpool and Edinburgh were announced on 14th February. Additional dates were announced in York, Newcastle, Dublin, Southend, Portsmouth, Nottingham and a return to The Lowry in Salford. Further dates were added in Wolverhampton, Fordsham, Truro, Aylesbury & Cambridge.

West End (2022) 
On 18th March 2022, it was announced the show would run in London's West End at the Duke of York's Theatre from 30 August 2022 for a limited run until 18 September 2022 which was then extended until 25 September 2022. It was later announced the show would run for two encore performances on 21st & 28th November 2022 at London's Savoy Theatre to close the tour for 2022.

A Different Stage: The Book 
In February 2022, Barlow announced a new book titled 'A Different Stage' to be released on 1 September 2022. The book will contain photography from Barlow's one-man show.

Awards & Nominations

Original London production

References

Plays for one performer
2020s debut plays
2022 plays
English plays
Gary Barlow